Brzana Górna  is a village in the administrative district of Gmina Bobowa, within Gorlice County, Lesser Poland Voivodeship, in southern Poland. The village has a population of 600.

The name Brzana Górna means "Upper Brzana". The village and Brzana Dolna ("Lower Brzana") make up a single sołectwo called Brzana.

References

Villages in Gorlice County